Ferenc Sbüll ( or ) (around July 26, 1825  – August 12, 1864) was a Hungarian Slovene poet and Catholic priest in Hungary. He was born in Turnišče, a village in the Prekmurje region of Slovenia, then part of the Zala County of the Kingdom of Hungary. He studied in Kőszeg, Szombathely and Vienna. He wrote both secular and religious poetry in his native Prekmurje dialect. He died in Dolenci.

See also
 List of Slovene writers and poets in Hungary

References
 Anton Trstenjak: Slovenci na Ogrskem (Slovenes in Hungary), Maribor 2006. 

1825 births
1864 deaths
People from Turnišče
19th-century Slovenian Roman Catholic priests
Slovenian writers and poets in Hungary
Hungarian writers
19th-century Hungarian Roman Catholic priests